Slapnik is a small isolated settlement in the Municipality of Brda in the Littoral region of Slovenia. It has no permanent residents.

References

External links
Slapnik on Geopedia

Populated places in the Municipality of Brda